John Quinn (born 15 September 1970) is a New Zealand cricketer. He played in one List A match for Canterbury in 1994/95.

See also
 List of Canterbury representative cricketers

References

External links
 

1970 births
Living people
New Zealand cricketers
Canterbury cricketers
Sportspeople from Chertsey